The Unité Spéciale de la Police (USP) is the police tactical unit of the Grand Ducal Police that was created in Luxembourg in 1999. It is tasked with responding to especially dangerous situations such as hostage rescue operations, arrests of dangerous individuals, bomb threats, and dignitary protection duties. The unit trains abroad with comparable units, in particular the Belgian DSU and German SEK.

History
The USP was formed in 1999 as a merger of the Police Intervention Group counter-terrorist group and the Gendarmerie Mobile Brigade. By 2007, USP had conducted roughly 1,650 missions with an average of 300 assignments annually. Two-thirds of these missions were police arrests or surveillance, and one third of these tasks was close protection or other escort duties. Notable achievements of the formation include:

 The rescue in 2000 of a large number of Wasserbillig school members that had been taken hostage by a man armed with a pistol, grenade, and knife. The hostage-taker was shot and wounded, and all 45 children and 3 teachers were rescued.
The rescue in 2002 of the kidnapped son of a Swedish businessman.
The arrest and dismantling in 2003 of an Al Qaeda cell in Luxembourg.

Recruitment 

Applicants to the USP must be younger than 30 years-of-age with several years of experience in the Luxembourg police. Applicants under-go a selection test lasting one week. The applicants are tested for motivation, teamwork, thinking skills, and physical endurance. Once selected, candidates are trained over the course of six months in intervention, observation, and close protection. When this training is completed, the candidate is integrated into the USP.

Equipment 

The Unité Spéciale de la Police uses an assortment of weapons and vehicles including:

Wepons:

 AMP Technical Services DSR-1
 Benelli M3 Super 90
 Beretta 92F
 Brügger & Thomet APR
FN 303
FN P90 TR
FN Minimi
 Glock 17/Glock 26
 Heckler & Koch HK53
 Heckler & Koch MP5 (MP5A3, MP5SD, and MP5K)
 Heckler & Koch MZP1
 Heckler & Koch P7M13
 Heckler & Koch PSG1
 Heckler & Koch USP
Remington Model 870
 SIG Sauer P226/SIG Sauer P228
 Smith & Wesson Model 586/Smith & Wesson Model 686
 Steyr AUG
Vehicles:

TM-170, Grand Ducal Police armored vehicle.

References

ATLAS Network
Non-military counterterrorist organizations
Police tactical units
Protective security units